The Group B of the 2022 AFF Championship were one of the two groups of competing nations in the 2022 AFF Championship. It consisted of Vietnam, Malaysia, Singapore, Myanmar, and Laos. The matches took place from 21 December 2022 to 3 January 2023.

Vietnam and Malaysia advanced to the semi-finals as the top two teams on the group.

Teams

Standings

Matches

Myanmar vs Malaysia

Laos vs Vietnam

Singapore vs Myanmar

Malaysia vs Laos

Laos vs Singapore

Vietnam vs Malaysia

Myanmar vs Laos

Singapore vs Vietnam

Vietnam vs Myanmar

Malaysia vs Singapore

References

Notes

External links 
 Official Website

Group stage